Józef Weyssenhoff Square is an open place in the downtown district of Bydgoszcz, Poland; several of its buildings are registered on the Kuyavian-Pomeranian Voivodeship Heritage List.

Location 
The area links Adam Mickiewicz Alley,  Ossoliński Alley and Powstańców Wielkopolskich alley. Northern facades date back to the late 19th century style, while southern ones display modernist features from the first decade of the 20th century.

Naming 
 1906–1920, Bülowplatz, after Bernhard von Bülow; 
 1920–1933, Plac Zacisze ("Tranquility Square")
 1933–1939, Plac Józefa Weyssenhoffa, after Józef Weyssenhoff, Polish writer and literary critic, who lived at Nr.1 from 1924 to 1928;
 1939–1945, Johann Fichte Platz, after Johann Gottlieb Fichte;
 Since 1945, Plac Józefa Weyssenhoffa.
The current name refers to Józef Weyssenhoff (1860-1932), a Polish writer, novelist, poet, literary critic, publisher
who lived at the tenement at Nr.1 in the 1920s.

History 

The square was founded in 1903 in the same conditions as Adam Mickiewicz Alley. It is a triangular square from which radiated: 
 Bülow straße (today Adam Mickiewicz Alley) to the north west;
 Hohenzzolernstrasse (today Ossoliński Alley to the south-east;
 in the late 1930s, Powstańców Wielkopolskich alley to the east.
In the middle was planted flowerbeds, shrubs and trees. In 1926, coniferous and deciduous trees were put. 
Between 1905 and 1911, a frontage of five-story apartment buildings have been built, following Art Nouveau and Historicism styles.

Architecture 
Frontages of Józef Weyssenhoff Square compose a complex of townhouses inscribed in the German variant of Art Nouveau architecture. Predominant forms evoke quietness, through varied bay windows, divided balconies and loggias integrating wavy lines, wavy gables, vaulted windows and portals. Decoration combines organic themes with geometric forms, like rectangular and square shapes, grouped in series and friezes. The ensemble reminds also Baroque style at by applying domes avant-corps and towers topped with peaks.

Some of the architects who designed those buildings had a significant influence on Bydgoszcz urbanism:
 Rudolf Kern who built also tenements in Gdańska Street at 5, 67, 66-68 and 71;
 Erich Lindenburger who constructed also at 41,43,45,47 Dworcowa Street;
 Paul Böhm who realized houses at 1 and 3 August Cieszkowski Street in Bydgoszcz;
 Józef Święcicki, known for its dozens of realization in Gdańska Street;
 Bogdan Raczkowski, designer of the Polonia Bydgoszcz Stadium and the Antoni Jurasz university hospital in the 1930s.

For almost the entire post-war period, tenements have been property of the state. In 1990, the city of Bydgoszcz owned them back, but at the time, they were falling into disrepair as a result of underinvestment, lack of maintenance and general neglect of Art Nouveau monuments. Buildings have been restored after 2002.

Main buildings

Tenement at 1 Józef Weyssenhoff Square
1905–1906, by Rudolf Kern

Art Nouveau

This is the house where Józef Weyssenhoff in from 1924 to 1928; a plaque has been placed on the facade in memoriam. 

Both facades display bay windows with loggias or balconies. A richly decorated frieze runs at the bottom of the gable boasting dormers.

Tenement at 2 Józef Weyssenhoff Square

1927, by Bogdan Raczkowski

Modern Architecture

House on the border of the Sielanka district, displaying a mix of functionalist style (left side) and eclectic shapes (right side) with a loggia and Mansard roof.

Tenement at 3 Józef Weyssenhoff Square

1905–1910, by Erich Lindenburger

Art Nouveau

Tenement at 4 Józef Weyssenhoff Square

1933, by Eugeniusz Wellman

Modern Architecture

Functionalist edifice, abutted to Nr.2.

Tenement at 5 Józef Weyssenhoff Square

Registered on Kuyavian-Pomeranian Voivodeship heritage list, Nr.743201-Reg.A/1573 (October 29, 2010)

1908–1909, by Paul Böhm

Art Nouveau

At the beginning of the 20th century, Wiktor Weynerowski, entrepreneur and father of Antoni Weynerowski, lived there.
The facade display 3 levels of balconies. The building has been recently refurbished.

House at 6 Józef Weyssenhoff Square

1934–1935, by Konstanty Dzielinski

Modern Architecture

Functionalist house, similar to buildings down Ossoliński Alley.

Tenement at 7 Józef Weyssenhoff Square

1909-1910

Art Nouveau

The facade is characterised by a balanced, even symmetry around the large arcade running above the entry gate. This round motif is recurrent through the whole frontage, from the ground level arcades up to the curved pediment.

Tenement at 9 Józef Weyssenhoff Square

Registered on Kuyavian-Pomeranian Voivodeship heritage list, Nr.725836-Reg.A/1522 (March 20, 2009)

1910–1911, by Georg Baesler

Art Nouveau

Building of the Institute of Agriculture

Registered on Kuyavian-Pomeranian Voivodeship heritage list, Nr.601254-Reg.A/676/1-8 (May 20, 1992)

Józef Weyssenhoff Square Nr.11

1903–1906, by H. Delius

Eclecticism

The architectural ensemble of the Institutes of Agriculture in Bydgoszcz occupies an area of 7.5 hectares, between J. Weyssenhoff Square, Ossolińsky Alley, Powstańców Wielkopolskich Alley and Karol Szymanowski Street. The western area is laid out with buildings, the eastern one is a 5 ha zone of field vegetation, with livestock, greenhouses and a barn.

See also 

 Bydgoszcz
 Józef Weyssenhoff
 Ossoliński Alley in Bydgoszcz
 Adam Mickiewicz Alley in Bydgoszcz

References

External links 
 Library of UKW - University of Bydgoszcz

Bibliography 
  
  
  
  
  

Weyssenhoff 
Streets and squares in Bydgoszcz
Villas in Bydgoszcz